Mark Knowles and Daniel Nestor won in the final 6–3, 7–5, 6–0 against Mahesh Bhupathi and Max Mirnyi.

Seeds
Champion seeds are indicated in bold text while text in italics indicates the round in which those seeds were eliminated. All eight seeded teams received byes to the second round.

Draw

 NB: The Final was the best of 5 sets while all other rounds were the best of 3 sets.

Final

Top half

Bottom half

External links
 2002 Mutua Madrileña Masters Madrid Doubles Draw

Men's Doubles
Mutua Madrilena